Mazımqarışan (also, Mazym-Garyshak, Mazymgaryshan, Mazymkaryshan, Mazymkharyshan, and Myzymkaryshan) is a former village in the Balakan Rayon of Azerbaijan.  The village forms part of the municipality of Tülü.

References 

Populated places in Balakan District